Cheatle is a surname. Notable people with the surname include:

 Alexandra Cheatle (born 1994), British singer-songwriter known by her stage name Zyra (singer)
 Alfred Edward Cheatle (1841–1941), British architect
 Arthur Henry Cheatle (1866–1929), British surgeon
 Duncan Cheatle, British businessman
 George Lenthal Cheatle (1865–1951), British surgeon
 Giles Cheatle (born 1953), British cricketer
 Lauren Cheatle (born 1998), Australian cricketer and daughter of Giles
 Syd Cheatle (born 1943), Irish writer

See also
 Cheadle (disambiguation)